The 10th Beijing College Student Film Festival was held in 2003 in Beijing, China. Zhou Yu's Train was the biggest winner, receiving three awards, including Best Director, Best Actor, and Favorite Actress.

Awards
 Best Film Award: Cala, My Dog!
 Best Director Award: Sun Zhou for Zhou Yu's Train
 Best Actor Award: Sun Honglei for Zhou Yu's Train
 Best Actress Award: Ni Ping for Pretty Big Feet
 Best Visual Effects Award: Hero
 Best First Film Award: Ma Xiaoying for Gone Is the One Who Held Me Dearest in the World
 Favorite Actor Award: Ge You for Cala, My Dog!
 Favorite Actress Award: Gong Li for Zhou Yu's Train, Zhou Xun for Where Have All the Flowers Gone
 Favorite Film: Eyes of a Beauty
 Artistic Exploration Award: Chicken Poets
 Grand Prix Award: Together with You, When Ruo Ma was Seventeen
 Committee Special Award: Deng Xiaoping, Jing Tao Hai Lang, Gada Meilin
 Best Child Actor Award: Zhang Yan for Warm Spring
 Special Award for National Spirit: Jing Tao Hai Lang
 Outstanding Contribution to Chinese Cinema Award: Zhang Yimou

References

External links
 10th Beijing College Student Film Festival Sohu

Beijing College Student Film Festival
2003 film festivals
2003 festivals in Asia
Bei